AMBS may refer to: 

Anabaptist Mennonite Biblical Seminary, an Anabaptist Christian seminary based in the United States
Advanced Media Broadcasting System, a Philippine broadcast media company